Jan Gajdoš (27 December 1903 – 19 November 1945) was a Czech gymnast, representing Czechoslovakia. He competed in two Olympic Games and five gymnastics World Championships.

Competitive career

His first Olympics was in 1928, where he took silver in the team competition. Switzerland won the competition. Individually, he won no medals, but he finished fourth in the horizontal bar, and eighth in the rings. At the his next Olympics, in 1936, he again won no medals, but the team finished fourth in the team competition.

At the World Championships, he took three golds in the team competition; in 1926, 1930 and 1938. He also took a team silver in 1934. Individually, he took two silver medals in 1926. In 1930, he took overall silver, behind Josip Primožič, and also won bronze in the pommel horse and rings.

In 1934, he won no individual medals, but took sixth place overall. In his last World Championships, in 1938, he won gold both in the individual all-around and floor exercise, as well as top-8 place finishings on 4 of the 5 other apparatuses.

Legacy
An active member of Sokol organization, during World War II he was an active member of Sokol resistance group. He died shortly after the end of World War II, after being put on a death march by the Nazi Germans.

From 15–16 November 2008, an international gymnastics event was arranged in memory of Gajdoš; Jan Gajdoš Memorial 2008 in Brno.

References

External links
 
 
 

1903 births
1945 deaths
Czech male artistic gymnasts
Czechoslovak male artistic gymnasts
Olympic gymnasts of Czechoslovakia
Olympic silver medalists for Czechoslovakia
Gymnasts at the 1928 Summer Olympics
Gymnasts at the 1936 Summer Olympics
Sportspeople from Brno
Olympic medalists in gymnastics
Czech resistance members
Medalists at the 1928 Summer Olympics
Prisoners of Nazi concentration camps